Joseph Casey Coleman (born July 3, 1987) is an American professional baseball pitcher for the Leones de Yucatán of the Mexican League. He has played in Major League Baseball (MLB) for the Chicago Cubs and the Kansas City Royals.

Early life
Coleman was born in Fort Myers, Florida, and graduated from Mariner High School in Cape Coral, Florida. He played college baseball at Florida Gulf Coast University (FGCU) for the Florida Gulf Coast Eagles baseball team.  At FGCU, Coleman was teammates with future major league pitchers Richard Bleier and Chris Sale.

Career

Chicago Cubs
Coleman was drafted by the Cubs in the 15th round (461st overall) of the 2008 MLB draft.

On August 2, 2010, Coleman was called up to the MLB for the first time. On August 23, 2010, he earned his first MLB win on a 9–1 victory against the Washington Nationals. He also recorded his first MLB RBI in the same game.

In 2011, Coleman did not make the team out of Spring Training and was optioned to Triple-A Iowa. After injuries to starting pitchers Andrew Cashner and Randy Wells, he was recalled to Chicago and made his first start of the season on April 10 against the Milwaukee Brewers. On May 28, 2011, Coleman was optioned to the Iowa Cubs, Chicago's Triple-A affiliate after Randy Wells was activated from the 15-day disabled list.

In 2012, Coleman made 17 appearances for the Cubs, registering a 7.40 ERA and 5.9 K/9 in 24.1 innings of work. On November 28, 2012, Coleman was designated for assignment by the Cubs. He was outrighted to the Triple-A Iowa Cubs two days later. On April 14, 2014, Coleman was released by Chicago.

Kansas City Royals
On April 15, 2014, Coleman signed a minor league deal with the Kansas City Royals organization. On May 16, 2014, Coleman was selected to the active roster. Coleman appeared in 10 games for Kansas City in 2014, recording a 5.25 ERA with 5 strikeouts in 12.0 innings. On December 15, 2014, Coleman was designated for assignment. He was outrighted to Triple-A on December 24. After spending the 2015 season in Triple-A with the Omaha Storm Chasers, Coleman elected free agency on October 5, 2015.

Seattle Mariners
On December 17, 2015, Coleman signed a minor league deal with the Seattle Mariners organization. On April 4, 2016, Coleman was released by the Mariners.

Tampa Bay Rays
On July 7, 2016, Coleman signed a minor league contract with the Tampa Bay Rays. He spent the remainder of the season with the Charlotte Stone Crabs and Durham Bulls and elected free agency on November 7, 2016.

New Britain Bees
On April 7, 2017, Coleman signed with the New Britain Bees of the Atlantic League of Professional Baseball.

Houston Astros
On April 30, 2017, Coleman's contract was selected by the Houston Astros. He was released on July 6, 2017.

Return to Bees
On July 24, 2017, Coleman resigned with the New Britain Bees of the Atlantic League of Professional Baseball. He became a free agent after the 2017 season.

Sugar Land Skeeters
On May 26, 2018, Coleman signed with the Sugar Land Skeeters of the Atlantic League of Professional Baseball. In 7 games and 6 starts he was 3–0 with a 0.96 ERA and with a 38/10 K/BB ratio.

Return to the Chicago Cubs
On July 3, 2018, Coleman's contract was purchased by the Chicago Cubs. In 10 games and 5 starts he was 2–4 with a 6.91 ERA and with a 23/10 K/BB ratio. He elected free agency on November 3, 2018.

New York Mets
On January 3, 2019, Coleman signed a minor league deal with the New York Mets. He was assigned to AAA Syracuse Mets. Coleman was released by the organization on July 4, 2019.

Toros de Tijuana
On July 23, 2019, Coleman signed with the Toros de Tijuana of the Mexican League. Coleman did not play in a game in 2020 due to the cancellation of the LMB season because of the COVID-19 pandemic. He later became a free agent.

Leones de Yucatán
On February 25, 2022, Coleman signed with the Leones de Yucatán of the Mexican League.

Personal life
Both his father and grandfather were pitchers in the MLB, making them the fourth family with three generations of major leaguers. His father, Joe, played from 1965 to 1979, and his grandfather, also named Joe, played from 1942 to 1955. He is also the first third-generation pitcher in Major League history.

See also

Third-generation Major League Baseball families

References

External links
 

 Baseball Almanac

1987 births
Living people
American expatriate baseball players in Mexico
Baseball players at the 2015 Pan American Games
Baseball players from Florida
Boise Hawks players
Chicago Cubs players
Daytona Cubs players
Florida Gulf Coast Eagles baseball players
Iowa Cubs players
Kansas City Royals players
Major League Baseball pitchers
Mexican League baseball pitchers
New Britain Bees players
Omaha Storm Chasers players
Pan American Games medalists in baseball
Pan American Games silver medalists for the United States
Peoria Chiefs players
Sportspeople from Fort Myers, Florida
Sugar Land Skeeters players
Syracuse Mets players
Tacoma Rainiers players
Tennessee Smokies players
Tomateros de Culiacán players
Toros de Tijuana players
United States national baseball team players
Medalists at the 2015 Pan American Games